The Houston Brewing Company was a brewery in the village of Houston, Renfrewshire, Scotland. It operated from 1997 to 2016.

For most of its existence was attached to, and operated in common with, the Fox & Hounds public house  and, as a result of its size, is classed as a microbrewery. It produced a range of cask conditioned ales alongside a range of seasonal and bottled beers.

History
The Houston Brewing Company was established in 1997 in South Street, Houston in a premises attached to the Fox & Hounds pub. In September 2014, the pub business went into administration, however the brewery was owned separately and continued to trade until 2016.

At its height, the brewery was distributing throughout the United Kingdom, including to Aldi supermarkets and the Wetherspoons pub chain.

Awards
Various beers from the Houston Brewing Company won a number of awards and accolades from the Campaign for Real Ale and the Society of Independent Brewers (SIBA) in both UK national and Scottish regional contests. Most notable amongst these achievements are:

 Champion Beer of Scotland 2000 - St Peter's Well
 Champion Beer of Scotland 2001 - St Peter's Well
 Champion Bitter of Britain 2005 - Killelan
 Champion Best Bitter of Scotland 2005 -
 Champion Best Bitter of Britain 2011 - Peter's Well

Beers
The seven principal cask ales were (with alcohol by volume levels denoted):

Killellan Bitter, 3.7%
Peter's Well, 4.2%
Texas, 4.3%
Warlock Stout, 4.7%
Blonde Bombshell, 4%
Tartan Terror, 4.5%
Black & Tan, 4.2%

A feature of the Houston Brewing Company was the range of season ales that are produced (currently one per month) for distribution throughout the UK. The caricature style labels for the seasonal beers often depict members of staff of the Fox & Hounds pub.

See also

 Scottish beer
 Scottish Real Ale
 Houston, Renfrewshire
 List of breweries in Scotland

References

External links
 Official Brewery Website (archived)

Food and drink companies established in 1997
Breweries in Scotland
Companies based in Renfrewshire
1997 establishments in Scotland
Defunct companies of Scotland